V Centauri (V Cen) is a Classical Cepheid variable, a type of variable star, in the constellation Centaurus. Its apparent magnitude is 6.72, and it is approximately 2,500 light-years (800 parsecs) away based on parallax.  According to the South African Astronomical Observatory, the chemical composition was derived as being high in sodium (Na) and aluminium (Al) and low in magnesium (Mg). Following a normal composition for a Cepheid star, V Cen does not have any unusual characteristics. V Centauri's composition was observed alongside six other Classical Cepheid variable stars with the support of Russian, Chilean, and Ukrainian observatories.

References

Centaurus (constellation)
F-type supergiants
Centauri, V
071116
Durchmusterung objects
127297
5421
Classical Cepheid variables